Omar Abdul Razaq or Umar Abed al-Razek (عمر عبد الرزاق) was Finance Minister of the Palestinian National Authority for part of 2006. He represents the Hamas organization.

Razaq was arrested by Israel in June 2006 and freed in 2008.

References

Year of birth missing (living people)
Living people
Hamas members
Finance ministers of the Palestinian National Authority
Government ministers of the Palestinian National Authority
Academic staff of An-Najah National University
Palestinian economists
People from Salfit